Alfredo Hernández Barrera (born 24 December 1941) is a Cuban former rower. He competed in two events at the 1964 Summer Olympics.

Notes

References

External links
 
 

1941 births
Living people
Cuban male rowers
Olympic rowers of Cuba
Rowers at the 1964 Summer Olympics
Place of birth missing (living people)
Pan American Games medalists in rowing
Pan American Games bronze medalists for Cuba
Rowers at the 1967 Pan American Games
20th-century Cuban people
21st-century Cuban people